is the term for permanent employment in Japan. It was extremely common in major Japanese companies beginning with the first economic successes in the 1920s through the Japanese post-war economic miracle until after the bursting of the Japanese asset price bubble, the Lost Decade and the following economic reforms.

History
Shūshin koyō starts with an event called Shinsotsu-ikkatsu-saiyō (simultaneous recruiting of new graduates) in which a large cohort of recent university graduates all enter a company at once. It gave Japanese workers the important feeling of job security as part of Japanese management culture, and in turn, elicited a high degree of company loyalty. A high demand for the few available engineers forced companies to bind these employees to the company. The collapse of the Japanese asset price bubble and the following crisis in the 1990s did not weaken the practice. It was still even used in Japanese small businesses. Some critics of lifetime employment hoped that with Junichiro Koizumi's administration, lifetime employment would become less common. They hoped that neoliberal economics policies would result in privatization, firing of old and expensive workers, and the rise of part-time jobs. Due to the long recession and the financial crisis of 2007–2010, some companies discontinued the practice of shūshin koyō and implement mass layoffs. Thus, there was less job security as shūshin koyō was challenged.

However, as noted by Takahashi (2018): "in the case of regular workers, the practice of long-term employment is maintained, in the sense that both employers and labor unions still seek to avoid making dismissals or voluntary retirement solicitations."

References

External links
The State and Change in the "Lifetime Employment" in Japan: From the End of War Through 1995
 Japan: Rethinking Lifetime Employment
Japan’s ‘employment for life’ myth
New York Times In Japan, Secure Jobs Have a Cost
New York Times Japan Strives to Balance Growth and Job Stability
Is the Japanese employment system degenerating?

Employment in Japan
Japanese words and phrases
Japanese culture